Richard Tyler Blevins (born June 5, 1991), better known as Ninja, is an American Twitch streamer, YouTuber and professional gamer. Blevins began streaming through participating in several esports teams in competitive play for Halo 3, and gradually picked up fame when he first started playing Fortnite Battle Royale in late 2017. Blevins's rise among mainstream media began in March 2018 when he played Fortnite together with Drake, Travis Scott and JuJu Smith-Schuster on stream, breaking a peak viewer count record on Twitch. Blevins has over 18 million followers on his Twitch channel, making it the most-followed Twitch channel

Early life
Richard Tyler Blevins was born on June 5, 1991, and is of Welsh descent. Though born in the Detroit area, he moved with his family to the Chicago suburbs when he was an infant.  He attended Grayslake Central High School in Grayslake, Illinois, where he played soccer. Upon graduation, he decided to play video games professionally, entering tournaments, joining professional organizations, and live streaming his games.

Career

Esports and streaming
Blevins began playing Halo 3 professionally in 2009. He played for various organizations including Cloud9, Renegades, Team Liquid, and most recently, Luminosity Gaming. Blevins became a streamer in 2011. He began playing H1Z1, then moved to PlayerUnknown's Battlegrounds. He joined Luminosity Gaming in 2017 first as a Halo player, then to H1Z1, later moving to PUBG, where he won the PUBG Gamescom Invitational Squads classification in August 2017.

Blevins began streaming the newly released Fortnite Battle Royale shortly after the PUBG Gamescom Invitational. His viewership began to grow, which coincided with the game's growth in popularity over the late 2017/early 2018 period. His followers on Twitch had grown from 500,000 in September 2017 to over 2 million by March 2018.

In March 2018, Blevins became the first Twitch streamer to surpass 3 million followers on the platform. Later that month, he set the record for the largest concurrent audience on an individual stream (outside of tournament events), 635,000, while playing Fortnite with Drake, Travis Scott, and JuJu Smith-Schuster. This stream inspired Epic Games, the developers behind Fortnite, to host a charitable pro-am event featuring popular streamers like Blevins paired with famous celebrities in Fortnite at E3 2018 in June of that year; Blevins paired with electronic musician Marshmello and won the event. In April 2018, he broke his own viewing record during his event Ninja Vegas 2018, where he accumulated an audience of about 667,000 live viewers.

Blevins partnered with Red Bull Esports in June 2018, and held a special Fortnite event, the Red Bull Rise Till Dawn in Chicago on July 21, 2018, where players could challenge him. In April 2019, Red Bull released a limited-edition Red Bull can featuring an image of Blevins.

Blevins' rise in popularity on Twitch is considered to be synergistically tied to the success of Fortnite Battle Royale. He became the first PC player to surpass 5,000 Fortnite wins that same month. To acknowledge Blevins' importance to Fortnites success, Epic added a Ninja-based cosmetic outfit to the game in January 2020 as the first part of an "Icon Series" for other real-life personalities associated with Fortnite.

Reuters reported that Blevins had been paid  by Electronic Arts to promote Apex Legends, a competing battle royale game to Fortnite, for playing the game on his Twitch stream and promoting the title through social media account during Apex release in February 2019.

On August 1, 2019, Blevins left Twitch to stream exclusively on Microsoft's Mixer platform. His wife and manager Jessica told The Verge that the contract with Twitch had limited the ability for Ninja to grow his brand outside of video gaming, and that because of the state of Twitch's community, "it really seemed like he was kind of losing himself and his love for streaming."
In addition to a large number of subscribers on Twitch and Mixer, Blevins has over 24 million subscribers on YouTube as of April 2021. At the time, he was earning over $500,000 per month from streaming Fortnite and credits the game's free-to-play business model as a growth factor.

Due to the shutdown of Mixer in July 2020, Blevins was released from his exclusivity deal, enabling him to stream on other platforms.  On September 10, 2020, Blevins revealed that he would return to streaming on Twitch after signing an exclusive multiyear deal and streamed on the platform the same day.

On September 1, 2022, exactly two years after re-signing to Twitch, Blevins changed his name on his social media profiles, such as his Twitter and YouTube, to "User Not Found" with background graphics stating "Time Out". He simultaneously tweeted "I just need a break...I don't know when I will be back, or where". On September 8, 2022, Blevins announced his return to streaming, stating that he would be streaming simultaneously across multiple platforms, including Twitch, YouTube, TikTok, Instagram, and Facebook.

Other appearances
Blevins and his family were featured in several episodes of the television game show Family Feud in 2015. In an episode aired August 2019, after he had achieved his fame, his family returned as contestants on Celebrity Family Feud.

In September 2018, Blevins became the first professional esports player to be featured on the cover of ESPN The Magazine, marking a breakthrough into mainstream sports fame.

Blevins worked with the record label Astralwerks in October 2018 to compile an album titled Ninjawerks: Vol. 1 featuring original songs by electronic music acts. The album was released on December 14, 2018.

Blevins was one of several Internet celebrities featured in YouTube Rewind 2018: Everyone Controls Rewind. Blevins appeared briefly during the NFL's "The 100-Year Game" ad alongside numerous several professional football players that aired during Super Bowl LIII in 2019. He was the only participant in the commercial with no ties whatsoever to football in any form.

Blevins has released several books with publishing house Random House. Random House imprint, Clarkson Potter, published Get Good: My Ultimate Guide to Gaming on August 20, 2019.

Blevins participated in the second season of the Fox reality music competition The Masked Singer as "Ice Cream". He was voted out after his first performance to Devo's "Whip It" and Lil Nas X's "Old Town Road" and thus forced to unmasked. In an interview with Entertainment Weekly, Blevins said that he accepted an invitation to participate since his wife was a fan of the show.

In 2022, Blevins partnered with MasterClass to create a 30-day curriculum in which Blevins provides advice on how to become a successful streamer.

Charitable work
In a fundraising charity stream held in February 2018, Blevins raised over $110,000 to be donated to the American Foundation for Suicide Prevention. During the first Fortnite Battle Royale Esports event in April 2018, Blevins gave away nearly $50,000 in prize money, with $2,500 of that going to the Alzheimer's Association. Later in April, he participated in the #Clips4Kids charity event with fellow streamers DrLupo and TimTheTatman that raised over $340,000 for St. Jude Children's Research Hospital. At E3 2018, Blevins and Marshmello won the Fortnite Pro-Am event which resulted in the donation of the $1 million prize to a charity of their choice.

Controversies
In December 2016, Blevins released the address of a donor as retribution for having a racist screen name and donation message. This act, which is referred to as "doxing", is against the Twitch rules, which states they can result in an "indefinite suspension". Blevins was reported for this act, but only received a 48-hour suspension, which some believed was a result of Blevins' large audience on the platform. Blevins later tweeted that he deserved the punishment.

In March 2018, while in a stream with Nadeshot, Blevins improvised the word "nigga" while rapping to Logic's "44 More", a song in which the word was never actually said. This sparked controversy within his watching community and the general public. He later apologized for any offense caused and stated that he did not intend to say the word, instead attributing his use of the word to being "tongue-tied".

In August 2018, Blevins stated that he does not stream with female gamers out of respect for his wife and to avoid the rumors that such streaming could create. He received mixed reactions; some said that he should set an example and not make it more difficult for female streamers to rise to prominence, while others supported his stance, claiming that he should be allowed to do what he wants to protect his marriage. In response to his critics, Blevins has since reaffirmed his support for gender equality and restated his commitment to his marriage, also mentioning some prominent female streamers by name. He noted that women are welcome to play with him in a group or at events as he claims such situations allow him to "control the narrative more, without stupid drama and rumors flooding into our lives."

In October 2018, Blevins reported a player for "having a higher ping" than him. This led to a player claiming on November 16, 2018, that they had been banned as a result of the report, which Epic Games denied. Both of these incidents caused backlash against Blevins on social media.

In November 2018, Blevins received criticism for falsely reporting IcyFive, a Fortnite player, for stream sniping. After Blevins was eliminated by IcyFive, Blevins' teammate, DrLupo, told him to watch for an "emote", which IcyFive did perform. Blevins took this as proof that IcyFive was stream sniping and quickly reported the player. After reporting IcyFive, Blevins stated that he would "go out of his way" to ensure IcyFive got banned and told IcyFive that he would not report him if he left the game immediately, despite already having reported him. As IcyFive was not viewing the stream, he did not do so. Blevins assumed IcyFive was ignoring him and took out his phone in what appeared to be an attempt at directly contacting Epic Games. IcyFive claimed that he did not stream snipe Blevins and uploaded a video as proof. DrLupo later stated that he did not believe IcyFive stream sniped Blevins, mentioning that using an emote was a regular reaction to an increase in spectator count after elimination, and also stated that he did not condone Blevins' actions, comparing them to a rant. Blevins later apologized to IcyFive on Twitter but also accused the player of "playing the victim" and "milking" the incident, calling him "naive" for assuming players would be banned solely on his word.

Filmography

Television

Film

Awards and nominations

See also 
 List of most-followed Twitch channels

Notes

References

External links
 
 Ninja on Twitch

1991 births
Living people
American people of Welsh descent
People from Detroit
People from Grayslake, Illinois
American esports players
Twitch (service) streamers
American YouTubers
Gaming YouTubers
Fortnite
Shorty Award winners
The Game Awards winners
Streamy Award winners